Manayunk Special Services District of Philadelphia is a municipal authority providing business improvement district services in the Manayunk neighborhood of Northwest Philadelphia.

See also
 List of municipal authorities in Philadelphia

External links
 Manayunk Development Corporation

References

Special services districts in Philadelphia
Municipal authorities in Pennsylvania